A plenary power or plenary authority is a complete and absolute power to take action on a particular issue,   with no limitations. It is derived from the Latin term plenus ("full").

United States
In United States constitutional law, plenary power is a power that has been granted to a body  or person in absolute terms, with no review of or limitations upon the exercise of that power. The assignment of a plenary power to one body divests all other bodies from the right to exercise that power, where not otherwise entitled. Plenary powers are not subject to judicial review in a particular instance or in general.

There are very few clear examples of such powers in the United States, due to the nature of the Constitution, which grants different, but at times overlapping, roles to the three branches of federal government and to the states. For example, although the United States Congress, under Article I, Section 8, Clause 3 (the Commerce Clause), has been said to have "plenary" power over interstate commerce, this does not always preclude the states from passing laws that affect interstate commerce in some way. When an activity is legally classified as interstate commerce, historically the states can regulate this type of activity as long as they do so within the bounds of their Constitutional authority. Congress does appear to have complete and absolute power regarding the declaration of war and peace in Article I, Section 8, Clause 11. Yet the President has control over the Armed Forces as Commander-in-Chief. These powers are in ongoing conflict, as seen by the War Powers Resolution of 1973.

Another example of the ongoing debate over plenary powers in the U.S. Constitution is the controversy surrounding the Spending Clause (Article I, Section 8, Clause 1). This clause states that the Congress is allowed to "lay and collect Taxes, Duties, Imposts and Excises, to pay the Debts and provide for the common Defence and promote the general Welfare of the United States". How far this clause goes, and what it actually means in practice, has been hotly debated since the ratification of the Constitution.

While other Constitutional doctrines, such as the unenumerated powers of states and the rights of individuals, are widely held (both historically and currently) as limiting the plenary power of Congress, then-Associate Justice William Rehnquist reflected that "one of the greatest 'fictions' of our federal system is that the Congress exercises only those powers delegated to it, while the remainder are reserved to the States or to the people. The manner in which this Court has construed the Commerce Clause amply illustrates the extent of this fiction. Although it is clear that the people, through the States, delegated authority to Congress to 'regulate Commerce ... among the several States' (Commerce Clause), one could easily get the sense from this Court's opinions that the federal system exists only at the sufferance of Congress." (Hodel v. Virginia Surface Mining & Reclamation Association, 1981.)

These conflicts over the definition of who or what retains which plenary powers have wide-ranging consequences, as seen in the example of United States v. Kagama, where the Supreme Court found that Congress had complete authority over all American Indian (Indigenous people/governments) affairs. Many Indigenous people have the opinion that Congressional Plenary authority over Indigenous people is an act of tyranny given that they have little or no representation in that body. The 2020 United States election of President Biden resulted in the first Indigenous person appointed to the position of Secretary of the Interior, a department with primary responsibility over Indian affairs including the Bureau of Indian Affairs.

Statutes
The Congress may create and charter, through the enactment of statutes, corporate bodies (Federal Corporations) which can be granted (through the Congress' plenary power to legislate) derivative (derived from the legislation, as opposed to the Constitution itself) plenary power(s) in areas that are defined by statute and which comport with the constitution. The Tennessee Valley Authority (TVA) is an example of such an entity. It was created by the Congress as a Federal Corporation, and by statute, the TVA is given plenary authority over setting the rates (prices) it will charge customers for the electricity that it generates. The Congress effectively gave the TVA plenary power over its generated electricity rate setting process by statutorily making TVA's rate settings exempt and immune from legal review by any process whatsoever, be it State, Federal or otherwise. Once the TVA Act itself was ruled constitutional, its rate setting process received its derivative plenary power.

There is a difference in reach of plenary powers. While in the TVA example the Congress may at any time amend or remove TVA's plenary power to set the rates for the electricity it sells, the President's plenary power to pardon or commute those convicted under the laws of the United States is beyond the reach of the processes of the Federal Government, and requires the amendment of the U.S. Constitution, making it a truly plenary grant of power.

Presidential pardons
An example of a plenary power granted to an individual is the power to grant pardons for Federal crimes (not State crimes), which is bestowed upon the President of the United States under Article II, Section 2, of the U.S. Constitution. The President is granted the power to "grant Reprieves and Pardons for Offences (sic) against the United States, except in Cases of Impeachment".

That is, within the defined zone (e.g., all offenses against the United States, except impeachment), the President may reduce the punishment, up to the eradication of the fact of conviction and punishment, for offenses against the United States, entirely. Once done, the President's exercise of this power may not be reviewed by any body or through any forum; nor can this self-executing power (because it is self-executing), once exercised by a President, be reversed, or "taken back", by either the granting President, or any of his/her successors.

Neither the power to grant pardon nor the power to construct the scope of a pardon (a commutation) is within the reach of any subsequent review or alteration. Furthermore, double jeopardy prohibits any subsequent prosecution for the offenses over which the pardon was granted. Even the President themself may not rescind a pardon that either they or a predecessor President has granted once such pardon is executed (i.e., once the official instrument is signed by the President and sealed on behalf of the United States).

The President may also (as in the case of President Gerald Ford and the then former President Richard Nixon, as well as President George H. W. Bush and the former Secretary of Defense Caspar W. Weinberger) prospectively proclaim a grant of pardon. That is the President may proclaim the pardon of an individual, a group, a corporation, or any entity chargeable of offenses under Federal law, prospectively making the subject immune from Federal prosecution for past criminal acts.

Such a pardon does this by destroying the possibility of a prosecution having a purposeful meaning or result. The rules of judicial procedure make such a future prosecution, or the continuance of an ongoing prosecution, moot. Thereby a motion for dismissal of an ongoing prosecution, or of an initiated future prosecution, is granted by a Court, on the grounds that the prosecution would be of no purpose or effect, and that it would needlessly waste a court's time and the resources of an accused, who would only have the charges, for which a pardon had been proclaimed, dismissed anyway.

Immigration law

In regard to immigration law, Congress, under the Plenary Power Doctrine, has the power to make immigration policy subject to limited judicial oversight. The Executive Branch is charged with enforcing the immigration laws passed by Congress. The doctrine is based on the concept that immigration is a question of national sovereignty, relating to a nation's right to define its own borders. Courts generally refrain from interfering in immigration matters. Historically, the U.S. Supreme Court has taken a hands-off approach when asked to review the political branches' immigration decisions and policy-making. The Center for Immigration Studies, an organization with a slant toward isolationism, suggests there is a movement to limit political-branch control over immigration in favor of a judge-administered system. The U.S. Supreme Court case Zadvydas v. Davis is cited as an example of the U.S. Supreme Court not following plenary power precedent.

See also
Plenipotentiary

References

Legal terminology
Constitutional law
Article Two of the United States Constitution